Siquirres is a district of the Siquirres canton, in the Limón province of Costa Rica.  It is a center of commerce and has most of the services for the area's locals.

Toponymy
The name is derived from a native word meaning reddish colored.

History 
Siquirres was created on 19 September 1911 by Ley 11.

Geography 
Siquirres has an area of  km² and an elevation of  metres.

Locations
 Neighborhoods (Barrios): María Auxiliadora, Brooklin, San Rafael, San Martín, Triunfo, Miraflores, El Invu, Siquirritos, Betania
 Villages (Poblados): Alto Guayacán, Amelia, Amistad, Bajo Tigre, Barnstorf, Betania, Boca Pacuare, Boca Parismina, Calvario, Calle Tajo, Canadá, Caño Blanco, Carmen, Celina, El Coco, El Cocal, Dos Bocas, Encanto (norte), Encanto (sur), Ganga, Imperio, Indiana Dos, Indiana Tres, Indiana Uno, Islona, Lindavista, Livingston, Lucha, Milla 52, Moravia, Morazán, Nueva Esperanza, Nueva Virginia, San Alberto Nuevo, San Alberto Viejo, San Alejo, San Joaquín, Santo Domingo

Demographics 

For the 2011 census, Siquirres had a population of  inhabitants.

Notable people
 Esteban Alvarado, football goalkeeper
Hughenna L. Gauntlett, American surgeon

Transportation

Road transportation 
The district is covered by the following road routes:
 National Route 10
 National Route 32
 National Route 806

References 

Districts of Limón Province
Populated places in Limón Province